Servando & Florentino is a Venezuela music duo consisting of brothers Servando Primera (born 27 August 1980) and Florentino Primera (born 31 August 1981). They are the son of Venezuelan musician and activist Alí Primera, who died in 1985. They began their music career as part of the salsa band Salserín and left the group in 1997. In the same year, they released their debut album, Los Primera, which contained the lead single, "Una Fan Enamorada". The song topped the Hot Latin Songs and Tropical Airplay charts in the United States. The duo received three Lo Nuestro nominations for "Tropical/Salsa Duo or Group of the Year", "New Tropical/Salsa Artist of the Year", and "Tropical/Salsa Song of the Year" for "Una Fan Enamorada" in 1999. Their album, Los Primera, was nominated at the 1999 Latin Billboard Music Awards for "Tropical/salsa album of the year, duo or group" and "Tropical/salsa album of the year, new artist".

Discography
Discography taken from AllMusic:
Los Primera (1997)	
Muchacho Solitario (1999)
Paso a Paso (2000) 
Servando y Florentino (2006)

References

Musical groups established in 1997
Sibling musical duos
Musicians from Caracas
Salsa music groups
Latin pop music groups
Venezuelan musical groups